Juan Francisco Apaolaza (born 19 June 1997) is an Argentine professional footballer who plays as a forward for Arsenal de Sarandí on loan from Estudiantes.

Career
After joining the Estudiantes system in 2012, Apaolaza was promoted into their first-team squad in April 2018. He made his professional debut on 21 April during a home defeat to Belgrano in the Primera División, which preceded him signing a contract until June 2020 on 4 May. Three months later, Apaolaza scored the first goal of his senior career in a Copa Libertadores encounter with Gremio. On 18 January 2019, having scored twice in seventeen matches in 2018–19, Apaolaza was loaned to Patronato. He appeared thrice. In August 2019, Apaolaza headed to Instituto on loan. He scored one goal, versus Villa Dálmine.

In October 2020, Apaolaza headed to Uruguay with Atenas. He made three Segunda División appearances for the club, notably netting in his sole home match on 23 October against Albion. He returned to Estudiantes on 16 December.

At the end of January 2022, Apaolaza joined Arsenal de Sarandí on loan for the rest of the year.

Career statistics
.

References

External links
 
 
 
 

1997 births
Living people
Sportspeople from Buenos Aires Province
Argentine footballers
Association football forwards
Argentine expatriate footballers
Expatriate footballers in Uruguay
Argentine expatriate sportspeople in Uruguay
Argentine Primera División players
Primera Nacional players
Uruguayan Segunda División players
Estudiantes de La Plata footballers
Club Atlético Patronato footballers
Instituto footballers
Atenas de San Carlos players
Arsenal de Sarandí footballers